The 1949 Iowa Hawkeyes football team represented the University of Iowa in the 1949 Big Nine Conference football season. This was Eddie Anderson's eighth and final season as head coach for the Hawkeyes.

Schedule

References

Iowa
Iowa Hawkeyes football seasons
Iowa Hawkeyes football